Aarne Valkama (1909 – 12 November 1969) was a Finnish nordic combined skier who competed in the 1930s. He won a bronze medal in the individual event at the 1937 FIS Nordic World Ski Championships in Chamonix.

External links

Finnish Skiers - Olympic and World Championship Results

Finnish male Nordic combined skiers
1909 births
1969 deaths
Place of birth missing
Place of death missing
FIS Nordic World Ski Championships medalists in Nordic combined
20th-century Finnish people